Benjamin L. Simpson (September 5, 1878 – October 20, 1964) was a star football player in  the Interprovincial Rugby Football Union (Big Four) for seven seasons for the Hamilton Tigers. He was inducted into the Canadian Football Hall of Fame in 1963 and into the Canada's Sports Hall of Fame in 1975.

External links
 Canada's Sports Hall of Fame profile

1878 births
1964 deaths
Players of Canadian football from Ontario
Sportspeople from Peterborough, Ontario
Hamilton Tigers football players
Queen's Golden Gaels football players
Canadian Football Hall of Fame inductees